Jorge Oscar Rabassa (1948 - ) is an Argentine geomorphologist and Quaternary geologist. He is a professor at National University of Tierra del Fuego and director of the CONICET. He is member of the National Academy of Sciences of Argentina since 2012. From 1998 to 2002 he served as rector of the National University of Comahue.

References

Argentine geographers
Argentine geologists
Geomorphologists
National University of La Plata alumni
Academic staff of the National University of Comahue
Quaternary geologists
Year of birth missing (living people)
Living people